Nazraeli Press is a publisher of books of photography. It was founded in 1989, in Munich, Germany, by Chris Pichler and has been based in the USA since 1996.

Nazraeli publishes roughly 30 new titles each year and has published over 400 with work by photographers from the United States, South America, Europe and Asia. Pichler runs the company with director Alison Crosby. Nazraeli publishes traditional monograph books, and also produces books in various niche series where each series has its own characteristics: One Picture Book, NZ Library, and Six by Six.

Nazraeli has been based in Germany (1989–1996), Tucson, Arizona (1996–2001?), Portland, Oregon (2001 – 2014/2015?) and Paso Robles, California. (since 2014/2015?). It has facilities in Manchester, England, for sales in Europe.

Book categories
Nazraeli publishes traditional monographs with print runs up to 3000 copies, and also produces these book series:

One Picture Book – small sized format, hardcover, uniformly designed, 16 pages long, with a signed and numbered tipped-in print (signed on the verso by the artist, hence the name of the series). Produced in groups of four titles at a time, approximately twice a year, in editions of 500 copies. The authors are both established photographers and unpublished, lesser-known photographers. One Picture Book were first published in 2000 and will cease in this format in 2016 with the hundredth publication.
NZ Library – 12 x 15 inches in size, in a slipcase. Produced as a set of six new titles, once or twice a year, in editions of 350 copies.
Six by Six – oversized, in a slipcase, with a loose signed print. A total of six sets will be produced every six months, each set containing six titles, in editions of 100 copies.

In conjunction with Joy of Giving Something (JGS), Nazraeli distributed the seven issues of JGS' journal, Witness, between 2007 and 2009. For each issue a different photographer guest edited – choosing their own work and that of others for inclusion, and designing the cover and much of the contents.

Authors (selected)
Some of the people whose work has been published by Nazraeli Press:

References

External links
 (US site)
 (UK / European site)
Interview with Chris Pichler by Lynette Letic at Lucida Magazine
Interview with Chris Pichler by Pilar Gonzalo

Visual arts publishing companies
Book publishing companies based in California
Publishing companies established in 1989
1989 establishments in Germany